Kenroy Howell (born 6 March 1993 in Manchester) is a Jamaican footballer.

Career

Youth
Howell debuted for Royal Lakes FC of the St. Catherine Football Association in 2009 and remained with the club until 2013 when he transferred to Waterhouse F.C. of the Jamaica National Premier League. During the 2010 season, he was named the league most valuable player and most outstanding junior player as he scored 13 times and lead the team to the league title. He also played four years at Spanish Town High School, scoring 27 total goals.

Professional
Howell began his professional career with Waterhouse during the 2013-14 season after being brought up from the Under-21 team. He stayed with the club for three seasons, tallying 15 goals over that time. With the club he also competed in the 2014 CFU Club Championship, scoring two goals as the club topped its group. In July 2016, he was loaned to Salvadoran club C.D. Dragón for the remainder of the 2016 Salvadoran Primera División season. During his time with the club, he scored 1 goal in 16 league appearances, with his only goal coming against Isidro Metapán in October 2016. With Dragón, Howell also made four appearances in the group stage of the 2016–17 CONCACAF Champions League. He scored a goal against the Portland Timbers of Major League Soccer in the tournament in an eventual 1–2 defeat.

In December 2016, it was announced that Waterhouse FC transferred Howell to the Pittsburgh Riverhounds of the USL on a 1-year deal with a club option for an additional year. At the end of the season, the club did not pick up the option, and Howell departed Pittsburgh after just one year with the Riverhounds. In 2018, Howell returned to Waterhouse FC in Jamaica.

References

External links
 
 Kenroy Howell at Jamaica Football Database

1993 births
Living people
Jamaican footballers
Association football forwards
Pittsburgh Riverhounds SC players
Jamaican expatriate footballers
Expatriate soccer players in the United States
People from Manchester Parish